
This is a list of Wikipedia articles of Latin phrases and their translation into English.

To view all phrases on a single, lengthy document, see: List of Latin phrases (full)

The list is also divided alphabetically into twenty pages:

 List of Latin phrases (A)
 List of Latin phrases (B)
 List of Latin phrases (C)
 List of Latin phrases (D)
 List of Latin phrases (E)
 List of Latin phrases (F)
 List of Latin phrases (G)
 List of Latin phrases (H)
 List of Latin phrases (I)
 List of Latin phrases (L)
 List of Latin phrases (M)
 List of Latin phrases (N)
 List of Latin phrases (O)
 List of Latin phrases (P)
 List of Latin phrases (Q)
 List of Latin phrases (R)
 List of Latin phrases (S)
 List of Latin phrases (T)
 List of Latin phrases (U)
 List of Latin phrases (V)

See also

 Latin influence in English
 Latinism

Lists

List of abbreviations used in medical prescriptions
List of ecclesiastical abbreviations
List of Germanic and Latinate equivalents in English
List of Greek phrases
List of Greek and Latin roots in English
List of Latin abbreviations
List of Latin and Greek words commonly used in systematic names
List of Latin words with English derivatives
List of Latin legal terms
List of medical roots, suffixes and prefixes

List of U.S. state and territory mottos
List of university and college mottos

Categories

Ancient Roman names
Dog Latin words and phrases
Latin biological phrases
Latin legal terms
Latin literary phrases
Latin logical phrases 

Latin mottos
Latin philosophical phrases

External links 

Notable idioms and concepts in Latin
 Commonly used Latin phrases
 Latin abbreviations
 Over 1000 Latin terms and phrases